2015 Dhaka South City Corporation Election Were hold at 30 April 2015. The election saw a 48.40% turnout. A total of 20 candidate took part in the mayoral election. The Bangladesh Nationalist Party candidate Mirza Abbas rejected the result and complained that the election was rigged. Sayeed Khokon won the election by a 241,005 vote majority. Three polling centers were suspended.

Result 

|-
! style="background-color:#E9E9E9;text-align:left;" width=225|Party 
! style="background-color:#E9E9E9;text-align:right;" |Seats won
! style="background-color:#E9E9E9;text-align:right;" |Seats change
|-
| style="text-align:left;" |Bangladesh Awami League
| style="text-align:center;" | 37
| style="text-align:center;" |  
|-
|-
| style="text-align:left;" | Awami rebel  
| style="text-align:center;" | 4
| style="text-align:center;" | 
|-
| style="text-align:left;" |Bangladesh Nationalist Party
| style="text-align:center;" | 7
| style="text-align:center;" | 
|-
| style="text-align:left;" |Jatiya Party (Ershad)
| style="text-align:center;" | 
| style="text-align:center;" | 
|-
| style="text-align:left;" |Independents
| style="text-align:center;" | 8
| style="text-align:center;" | 
|-
| colspan="3"|Source: Daily Ittefaq
|}

References 

2015 elections in Bangladesh
2015 in Bangladesh
Dhaka
Local elections in Bangladesh